Javier de la Torre (19 December 1923 - 26 November 2006) was a Mexican football player and manager.

Honours

Player
Guadalajara
Copa de Oro de Occidente: 1954, 1955, 1956

Manager
Guadalajara
Mexican Primera División: 1960-61, 1961-62, 1963-64, 1964-65, 1969-70
Copa México: 1962–63
Campeón de Campeones: 1961, 1964, 1965
CONCACAF Champions Cup: 1962

Mexico
CONCACAF Championship: 1971

References

1923 births
2006 deaths
Mexican footballers
C.D. Guadalajara footballers
C.D. Guadalajara managers
Mexico national football team managers
Tecos F.C. managers
Association football midfielders